Derek O'Connor may refer to:

 Derek O'Connor (footballer, born 1955), Scottish football striker for St. Johnstone and Hearts
 Derek O'Connor (footballer, born 1978), Irish football goalkeeper for Huddersfield Town
 Derek O'Connor (journalist), Irish writer and filmmaker